Live at Montreux 2003 is a video and a live album by British rock band Jethro Tull, released in 2007. It was recorded at the Montreux Jazz Festival where the band played in 2003.

Track listing

CD 1
"Some Day the Sun Won't Shine for You"
"Life Is a Long Song"
"Bourée" (Instrumental) (Version de Noël)
"With You There to Help Me"
"Pavane" (Instrumental)
"Empty Café" (Instrumental)
"Hunting Girl"
"Eurology" (Instrumental)
"Dot Com"
"God Rest Ye Merry Gentlemen"
"Fat Man"

CD 2
"Living in the Past"
"Nothing Is Easy"
"Beside Myself"
"My God"
"Budapest"
"New Jig" (Instrumental)
"Aqualung" (includes "Band introduction")
(Encore) "Locomotive Breath" (includes "Black Sunday (reprise)" and "Cheerio")

DVD track listing 
"Some Day the Sun Won't Shine for You" (Anderson)
"Life Is a Long Song" (Anderson)
"Bourée" (Instrumental) (Anderson) (Version de Noël) 
"With You There to Help Me"
"Pavane" (Instrumental) (Anderson)
"Empty Café" (Instrumental)(Barre, Noyce)
"Hunting Girl" (Anderson)
"Eurology" (Instrumental) (Giddings)
"Dot Com" (Anderson)
"God Rest Ye Merry Gentlemen" (Instrumental) (Anderson)
"Fat Man" (Anderson)
"Living in the Past" (Anderson)
"Nothing Is Easy" (Anderson)
"Beside Myself" (Anderson)
"My God" (Anderson)
"Budapest" (Anderson)
"New Jig" (Instrumental) (Giddings, Anderson)
"Aqualung" (includes "Band introduction")
 (Encore) "Locomotive Breath" (includes "Black Sunday (reprise)")
"Cheerio" (Instrumental) (Anderson)

Personnel
 Ian Anderson – vocals, flute, acoustic guitar, harmonica, mandolin
 Martin Barre – electric and acoustic guitar, flute
 Andrew Giddings – keyboard, accordion
 Doane Perry – drums, percussion
 Jonathan Noyce – bass guitar, percussion

See also 
 Living with the Past
 Live at Madison Square Garden 1978
 Bursting Out

References

External links 
 Official album page

Jethro Tull (band) video albums
Live progressive rock albums
Live video albums
2007 video albums
Jethro Tull (band) live albums
2007 live albums
Albums recorded at the Montreux Jazz Festival
Eagle Records video albums